Lesara was a clothing e-commerce site founded in Berlin in 2013. On November 9, 2018, the company filed for bankruptcy.

History
Lesara was founded in 2013 by CEO Roman Kirsch, COO Matthias Wilrich, and CTO Robin Müller. The company's head office was located at the Schicklerhaus in Berlin, Germany, and the second office was in Guangzhou, China.

Retail

Lesara was one of the first companies that used the concept of agile retail within the fashion industry. Agile retail is a direct-to-consumer retail model that uses big data to try to predict trends, manage efficient production cycles, and optimize turnaround on emerging styles. The company used data acquired from Google, social media, and blog posts, then analyzed it to identify current trends.

Criticism
In 2015, Lesara GmbH filed a suit against Daniel Brückner, which was dismissed by Landgericht Köln (Regional Court, Cologne) in 2016.

In September 2016, Beobachter reported about alleged illegal crossed-out prices in Switzerland, citing Guido Sutter, chief legal adviser of Federal Department of Economic Affairs, Education and Research (SECO) in Switzerland.

In early 2018, manager magazin reported that Lesara inflated revenue figures by not accounting for returns.

In November 2018, Lesara CEO Roman Kirsch filed for bankruptcy.

References

German companies established in 2013
Online clothing retailers of Germany
Companies based in Berlin